Dear.M is a 2022 South Korean college-romance television series starring Park Hye-su, Jeong Jae-hyun, Roh Jeong-eui and Bae Hyun-sung. It is the spin-off of the webseries Love Playlist. Directed by Park Jin-woo and Seo Joo-wan, and written by Lee Seul, the series follows the university life of four students at Seoyeon University as they search for "M" — the writer of a community article.

The airing of the first episode was postponed from its originally scheduled premiere date of February 26, 2021, on KBS2, in light of emerging school time bullying allegations against the lead actress, Park Hye-su. The series was originally part of a restructured 'Golden Friday' line-up on the KBS2 channel and was planned to air every Friday at 23:10 (KST).

Dear. M began airing its first six episodes ahead of its television release in June 29, 2022 through the streaming platforms Viki and U-Next. The next six episodes were released on July 6, 2022. The series received positive reviews, with praises towards the plot, performances (particularly of Jeong Jae-hyun whose role marks his acting debut), writing, tone, and pacing.

Synopsis
Things are turned upside down when an anonymous confession is published on Seoyeon University's student forum. Four students - Ma Joo-ah (Park Hye-su), Cha Min-ho (Jeong Jae-hyun), Seo Ji-min (Roh Jeong-eui), and Park Ha-neul (Bae Hyun-sung) - from different departments come together in search for “M”, the writer of the mysterious confession. They go through university-life, changing friendships, and realistic budding romances in the course of their search.

Cast

Main

Women's Dormitory Room 103

 Park Hye-su as Ma Joo-ah 

Ma Joo-ah (21) is a 2nd-year student the Department of Business Administration (Enrolled in 2019). Her dream is to find her first love. She is full of energy and is an only daughter raised by a single mother. Cheerful and warm-hearted, she has been best friends with Cha Min-ho for twelve years. Her nickname Akma-Joo-ah (Devil-Joo-ah) was given to her by Min-ho, since she keeps making fun of his past relationships. Due to her inquisitive nature she is always meddling in her friends' business, but she is also generous and willing to go help anyone that needs it. Joo-ah entered Seoyeon University through a support program that assists single-parent families and is uncomfortable when asked about her admission process. Although it has been one year since entering Seoyeon University, she is still unsure with what she wants to do in the future. When others say they study hard because they have dreams, she studied hard because she doesn't have dreams. She has been single her entire life, but things start to change on the first day of the second semester of her second year, when her heart flutters because of a guy. Her roommates are Seo Ji-min and Hwang Bo-young.

 Roh Jeong-eui as Seo Ji-min

Seo Ji-min (22) is a 2nd-year student in the Department of Economics (Enrolled in 2019). Her dream is to become the leader of the cheer squad. She boasts bright floral beauty as the Centre of the Seoyeon University cheer squad and is one half of Seoyeon University's official 'Magnet Couple' along with Park Ha-neul. Behind her innocent appearance, there is a reversal that causes girl crush. Ji-min is very adept in social situations, and knows how to stand up boldly to seniors in the face of injustice. Couple rings, couple trips, couple photos—everything is a hot topic when it comes to the pair. She is older than most of her peers as she repeated a year. Since many students in her grade either took a leave of absence or had to fulfil their enlistment duties, she is not close to many people except Ha-neul. However, she reunites with Choi Ro-sa whom she went to high school with and they quickly become close.

 Woo Da-vi as Hwangbo Young

Hwangbo Young (24) is a 1st-year student in the Department of Business Administration (Enrolled in 2020). Her dream is to be able to eat all she wants. Unlike her young and cute-looking appearance, she is a very chic 24-year-old college student. She is deeply empathetic and is good at detecting subtle emotions. Although she has yet to obtain her Bachelor’s degree, she is said to possess a Master of Dating. Young is relentless in relationships and will not hesitate to separate from someone who does not align with her relationship views. In Dorm 103, she often provides love advice to Ji-min, who is in the midst of a passionate relationship, and Joo-ah, who is experiencing her first crush. She graduated from a prestigious vocational high school, and was employed immediately in a public corporation in the financial sector. However, after suffering discrimination from college graduates in various ways, she studied hard again and entered the Department of Business Administration. She has Type 1 Diabetes, thus carries an insulin syringe pouch every day since elementary school. Because of that, she can't eat all that she wants.

Men's Dormitory Room 203

 Jeong Jae-hyun as Cha Min-ho

Cha Min-ho (21) is a 2nd-year student in the Department of Computer Science (Enrolled in 2019). His dream is to become an app developer and to buy his sister a house. He is bold and has good guts, with his specialty being teasing Ma Joo-ah with whom he has been best friends with for 12 years. Whilst he has a sloppy appearance, when he's hooked on something he tends to become serious. He is the sexiest when coding in front of a computer, and he knows that as well. Min-ho has a talent for developing apps with his innovative ideas. After developing an anti-bullying app in high school, he entered Seoyeon University through special admission. He has been gaining popularity after creating an app called “밥팅 (BOBting)” that matches up people who eat alone at school, leading to potential relationships. By developing such an app, he seems to be in touch with human psychology but Ma Joo-ah calls him "Min-hogu (Min-pushover)” because he has not been in a relationship longer than a month. His roommates are Park Ha-neul and Gil Mok-jin in Dorm 203. After their parents passed away 12 years ago, his sister Cha Min-ju gave up college to raise him, so he feels indebted to her. She never pressured him but he wanted to take responsibility for her sacrifice and enter a prestigious university, thus never missing a scholarship. He works a part-time job because he no longer wants to burden his sister and is also desperate to raise funds for her upcoming wedding.

 Bae Hyun-sung as Park Ha-neul

Park Ha-neul (22) is a 3rd-year student in the Department of Computer Science (Enrolled in 2018). His dream is to become a game developer. He is an honorary public relations ambassador and the other half of Seoyeon University's official 'Magnet Couple' along with Seo Ji-min. He is blunt and straight-forward, but a sweet boyfriend who enjoys taking photos of his girlfriend of 9 months. Since beginning their relationship, many things have happened. With the recent death of his father last winter, he came to realize that in his first two years of university, he did not have clear goals and was just going through life messily. So, in the second semester of his third year, he boldly transferred to the Department of Computer Science to pursue his dream of becoming a game developer. Many people around him were against it, but since he had the support of Ji-min, he felt that everything would turn out well. However, he didn't realize his new major would be so difficult.

 Lee Jin-hyuk as Gil Mok-jin

Gil Mok-jin (23) is 2nd-year student in the Department of Psychology (Enrolled in 2017). His dream is to no longer be single. He is considered a mood-maker with an outgoing and boisterous personality. In contrast to this, he is also strict when it comes to tidiness and loves to spend time shopping for cleaning supplies. Mok-jin is an older student who has returned from completing his military service, but his requests are often ignored by the younger occupants of Dorm 203. He cannot stand the smell of food so he and his roommates often eat outside. Whilst his major is Psychology, he tends to not understand the psychology of those around him and particularly fails at understanding women. Mok-jin is desperate for a partner, and is the most frequent user of Min-ho's “밥팅 (BOBting)” app. In his spare time he is seen posting on the student forum, taking all kinds of psychological tests, studying tarot cards and palmistry so that he can use it on his blind dates.

Supporting

Seoyeon University 

 Lee Jung-shik as Moon Joon

Moon Joon (24) is a 3rd-year student in the Department of Computer Science (Enrolled in 2016). He is the son of Moon Taek-gun, CEO of Levan Soft. Joon is considered a role model by Min-ho and many other juniors because of his gentle manners and leadership. He is also an older student who has returned from completing his military service. He lives in a single premium one-person room with rent that is more expensive than at the dorms. Also, he lies to his father about making mobile app using Cha min-ho as his cover.

 Hwang Bo-reum-byeol as Choi Ro-sa

Choi Ro-sa (22) is a 2nd-year student in the Department of Computer Science (Enrolled in 2018). She is Vice President of the cheer squad is a bright and straight-forward student who went to the same high school as Seo Ji-min. After finishing her first year, Ro-sa went on exchange for a year and a half. Upon returning, she was worried about having no friends but coincidentally reunited with Ji-min whom she had lost contact with and they got along just like old times. Ro-sa however, became filled with jealousy towards Ji-min as she slowly has a crush on Ji-min's boyfriend Ha-neul.

 Kwon Eun-bin as Min Yang-hee

Min Yang-hee (20) is a 1st-year student in the Department of Computer Science (Enrolled in 2020). Her nickname is "Goddess of Engineering". Her father is a pilot so she grew up in wealth and is always wearing luxury brands. She can be oblivious but her charms make her impossible to hate.

 Jo Joon-young as Ban Yi-dam

Ban Yi-dam (21) is a 1st-year student in the Department of Psychology (Enrolled in 2020). He takes photography classes and has a free-spirited, unconventional personality.

 Han Do-woo as Choi Tae-jin

Choi Tae-jin (25) is a 4th-year student in the Department of Computer Science (Enrolled in 2015).

 Jun Sung-hwan as Tak Moo-young

Tak Moo-young (21)  is a 2nd-year student in the Department of Business Administration (Enrolled in 2019).

 Choi Hee-seung as Kim Min-woo

Kim Min-woo (24) is a student in the Department of Business Administration (Enrolled in 2016) who is on a leave of absence.

Family Members 

  as Cha Min-ju

Cha Min-ju (31) is a bank employee and Cha Min-ho's sister. After their parents died in a car accident when she was 19 years old, she has been raising Min-ho herself. She is the only one that Min-ho (who is considered smart and good at arguing) cannot win over. She is a good talker and has a good sense of humour. She is dating someone from work and about to get married.

 Kim Joo-ah as Kim Mi-young

Kim Mi-young (48) has run Elephant Snacks for twelve years and is Ma Joo-ah's mother. She is kind and always willing lend a hand to those in need. When she was young, she broke up with her alcoholic husband and raised Joo-ah alone. As it has always been just the two of them, they are very close.

  as Moon Taek-geun

Moon Taek-gun (53) is the CEO of Levan Soft and Moon Jun's father. He is a first generation IT mogul and unlike his innovative company culture, he is quite harsh when it comes to academics.

 Song Kyung-hwa as Kim Jeong-im

Kim Jeong-im (49) is a professor and Park Ha-neul's mother. Her husband passed away last winter so she is now alone. She is a person who is strong and warm enough to be Ha-neul's 'first love'.

 Lee Jae-baek as Seo Ji-hoon

Seo Ji-hoon (19) is a senior high-school student and Seo Ji-min's brother. He and Ji-min seem to bear no similarities.

Others

 Seo Hee-sun as Yoon Ho-jung
Joyfle as Gru

Production

Development
In late June 2020, it was reported that Love Playlist would be rebooted under the working title Dear.M: Love Playlist 2021 with new cast members, except for Bae Hyun-sung and Kim Sae-ron.

Casting
In September 2020, Park Hye-su Kim Sae-ron, Jeong Jae-hyun and Bae Hyun-sung were cast in lead roles, with Kim and Bae reprising their roles from the web series Love Playlist. The series marks Jeong Jae-hyun's acting debut. On October 12, 2020, Kim Sae-ron left the series due to a row over the cast billing order. On October 14, the production company cited a "difference of opinion" as the reason for Kim leaving the cast. Roh Jeong-eui replaced Kim.

Filming
The series is entirely pre-produced with filming scheduled to be completed in early February in order for the production team to focus on post-production and music editing.

Release
The release of Dear.M was indefinitely postponed due to a controversy involving school violence allegations against Park Hye-su. In response to a petition on the KBS Viewer's Rights Centre requesting the removal of the actress from Dear.M, KBS Chief Producer (Jo Hyun-ah) stated, "As the truth is being challenged on the relevant matter and a police investigation is underway, KBS has implemented postponement of the drama, and we are monitoring the situation until the facts are revealed. Depending on the result [of the investigation], we will implement measures for all matters including the organisation and re-shooting of Dear. M." KBS stated that television series Imitation originally scheduled for May 21, 2021 will be aired on May 7, 2021.

In April 2021, it was announced that for the time being, the series will be broadcast tentatively in August 2021. On January 11, 2022 it was announced that presently series has been put on hold till the police investigation results come out.
 
In March 2022, it was announced that Dear. M will be aired first in Japan in the second half of 2022. KBS further confirmed that they were negotiating with other countries regarding the series' copyright license. In May 2022, the Japanese streaming platform, U-NEXT announced in a press release that they would be exclusively distributing Dear. M starting in late June 2022. In June 2022, Viki restored Dear.M in their catalogue and re-released teasers.

On June 29, 2022, the first six episodes of Dear.M were digitally released on Viki and U-Next. Its next six episodes were released on July 6, 2022.

Soundtrack

Album

International broadcast
The series will be available with multilingual subtitles on iQIYI  in South East Asia.

The series will be available for streaming through Viu in Indonesia, the Philippines, Singapore and Thailand with subtitles, and on Rakuten Viki in other regions with multilingual subtitles.

References

External links
  
 
 
 
 Dear. M at Daum 
 Dear. M at Naver 

Korean Broadcasting System television dramas
2022 South Korean television series debuts
2022 South Korean television series endings
Korean-language television shows
South Korean romance television series
2020s college television series
Television series by Monster Union
Playlist Studio original programming
Television spin-offs
South Korean pre-produced television series